

Plants

Angiosperms

Pteridophyta

Arthropods

Insects

Archosauromorphs

Pseudosuchians

Dinosaurs

Sauropterygia

Nothosauroidea

References